Elmer Joseph Holland (January 8, 1894 – August 9, 1968) was a Democratic member of the U.S. House of Representatives from Pennsylvania.

Early life and career
Elmer Holland was born in Pittsburgh, Pennsylvania.  He attended Duquesne University in Pittsburgh and the University of Montpellier, France.  He graduated from Saumur Cavalry School, France, in 1919.

He served with the American Expeditionary Forces during World War I as a second lieutenant of Field Artillery.

He was engaged as sales and advertising manager for a glass manufacturer from 1915 to 1933. He was elected as a member of the Pennsylvania State House of Representatives from 1934 to 1942. He also served as the superintendent of highways and sewers in Pittsburgh from 1940 to 1942.

Congress
He was elected as a Democrat to the 77th United States Congress to fill the vacancy caused by the resignation of Joseph A. McArdle and served from May 19, 1942, to January 3, 1943. He was not a candidate for renomination in 1942.

He served as a major in the European Theater of Operations during World War II. He served as a member of the Pennsylvania State Senate from 1943 to 1956.

He was again elected to the 84th United States Congress to fill the vacancy caused by the death of Vera Buchanan. He served until his death from a heart attack in Annapolis, Maryland on August 9, 1968. He is buried in Arlington National Cemetery.

See also
 List of United States Congress members who died in office (1950–99)

References

 Retrieved on 2009-01-24
The Political Graveyard

1894 births
1968 deaths
Politicians from Pittsburgh
Burials at Arlington National Cemetery
United States Army personnel of World War I
United States Army personnel of World War II
Military personnel from Pennsylvania
Democratic Party Pennsylvania state senators
Democratic Party members of the Pennsylvania House of Representatives
Duquesne University alumni
Democratic Party members of the United States House of Representatives from Pennsylvania
20th-century American politicians